The world's longest hot dog is a world record dating back to at least 2001.

Current world record 
After the official measurement, the hot dog was cut up and eaten by those present.

Previous world records

Guinness World Records does not reflect this record in any of its publications as of 2006.
 On July 2, 2003, a hot dog  was made by Vienna Beef and Rosen's Bakery for the Taste of Chicago, in celebration of National Hot Dog Month, to obtain the world record.
The bun used more than 200,000 poppy seeds.
It required  of sausage meat,  of dough,  of tomato sauce and mustard, and "enough onions to fill a Honda Civic."
The hot dog was made as the central part of a media event surrounding the 100th anniversary of Franz Family Bakeries.
International media were on hand, and supporting documents have been verified by Guinness. The hot dog was made as the central part of a media event surrounding the 50th anniversary of the All-Japan Bread Association. The wiener was made offsite at the Shizuoka plant prior to the day, and it was then cooked along with the bread in a ballroom at the Akasaka Prince Hotel in Akasaka, Tokyo, Japan. After the official measurement, the hot dog was cut up and eaten by those present.
International media were on hand, and supporting documents have been verified by Johanna Hessling, of Guinness. The hot dog was made as the central part of a media event surrounding the 2011 Expo in Asuncion, Paraguay. After the official measurement, the hot dog was cut up and eaten by those present.

Technical challenges
Creating a long hot dog is not much of a feat. This is because the hot dog is structurally quite sound, and remarkably flexible. In the August 2006 record breaking attempt, the hot dog was manufactured by Shizuoka Meat Producers, and was wound into a large plastic barrel which was easily transported inside a delivery van.

The limiting factor for breaking this type of record is the bun. The bun, in order to remain in one continuous unit, needs to be baked in its final form. For the All-Japan Bread Association, this meant the connection of the longest conveyor belt possible with the equipment available to them. The dough was assembled in half-meter sections, then pressed together to create a longer tube of dough, which was then fed through the ovens via conveyor, and carried away from the ovens by another conveyor. The key was to make sure that the already-cooked bun did not move at a faster rate than the bun behind it because this would cause the bun to pull apart. The wiener was fed through the oven at the same time to cook it.  There also needed to be space outside the oven to store the bun and wiener until the entire bun had been baked. To allow for enough room for this to happen, the ovens and prep area were set up outside the ballroom of the Akasaka Prince Hotel on the loading dock, and the bun and wiener were fed into the ballroom along the conveyor as they exited the oven.

Upon completion, the bun was sliced down the middle by bakers, and spectators were asked to don rubber gloves and first lift the wiener in one piece for photos, and then insert it into the bun. After photos and video of the official measurement were completed, the hot dog was cut into sections and the assembled spectators each had a piece.

References

Hot dog
Hot dogs
Hot dog